The Home Missions School is a co-educational, private school located in Aizawl, Mizoram, India. It was established in 1985 by founder and principal, Lalthlamuana Hnamte.

The school caters to pupils from kindergarten up to class 12 with English used as the medium of teaching. The school is affiliated to the Mizoram Board of School Education, Mizoram.

History 
When the school was established in 1985, it had only preparatory classes. In the year 2000, it has been upgraded to Secondary level prior to the permission granted by the State Government Education Department.

Curriculum
The school teaches a curriculum proposed by the Mizoram Board of School Education. The secondary section teaches two streams, Arts and Science. Music classes are conducted for grades 8, 9 and 11 while Fine Arts classes are conducted for grades 7 and below. Board classes, 10 and 12 write annual exams conducted by the Mizoram Board of School Education. 

In the Board's higher secondary school 2010 arts stream results, Home Missions School students ranked first, second, fifth and seventh in the statewide merit list.

One of the school's students attained fourth place, in the state rankings for the 2012 High School Leaving Certificate, and three other students were in the top 10.

Extra-curricular activities
Annual sports are conducted with different sport activities held in competition. The high school section also allows enrollment of the students in the National Cadet Corps (India).

References

Education in Aizawl
Private schools in Mizoram
High schools and secondary schools in Mizoram
Educational institutions established in 1985
1985 establishments in Mizoram